The Encyclopedia of Homosexuality (1990) was edited by Wayne R. Dynes, with the assistance of associate editors William A. Percy, Warren Johansson, and Stephen Donaldson. It was published in two volumes by Garland Press in 1990. The Encyclopedia contains 770 articles. It was reviewed positively in Reference & User Services Quarterly and, at length, in the Journal of Homosexuality. It was listed on several "Best Books of the Year" lists.

In 1995 the Encyclopedia was withdrawn by Garland, following accusations in the Chronicle of Higher Education that the editor, Dynes, had published articles under the pseudonym Evelyn Gettone. Dynes admitted that he had done so and apologized. Dynes subsequently said that this was due to "a pressure group of leftist and feminist activists who viewed the Encyclopedia as lacking in political correctness".

Shortly after its publication, work on an abbreviated edition of the Encyclopedia began, coordinated by Stephen Donaldson, and including new and revised articles. Because of Garland's withdrawal of the Encyclopedia, this concise version was never published.

References

External links

Full text archives:
 Encyclopedia of Homosexuality Wiki
 Encyclopedia of Homosexuality Sex Archive

Partial archive of concise version:
 

LGBT literature in the United States
1990 non-fiction books
Encyclopedias of sexuality
Homosexuality
1990s LGBT literature
Stonewall Book Award-winning works